Ammoron should not be confused with Amaron, Ammaron, Amoron, or Moron (Book of Mormon) three other Book of Mormon figures with similar names.

According to the Book of Mormon, Ammoron was a Nephite traitor. A descendant of Zoram, he succeeded his brother Amalickiah as the king of the Lamanites.  Amalickiah, as king, started a major war with the Nephites, which the Nephites had hoped would end with his death. However, Ammoron seized power and continued the war. Eventually his armies were defeated after he was assassinated by Teancum.

References 

Book of Mormon people